Curcani is a commune in Călărași County, Muntenia, Romania. It is composed of two villages, Curcani and Sălcioara.

At the 2002 census, there were 5233 inhabitants. Of these, 65.8% were ethnic Romanians and 34.1% Roma; 99.6% were Romanian Orthodox.

The commune's name, meaning "turkeys", was bestowed in the aftermath of the Romanian War of Independence, and refers to a nickname given to Dorobanț troops.

References

Curcani
Localities in Muntenia
Populated places established in 1878